Cosmin Bodea (born 12 June 1973) is a Romanian football manager and former player.
Bodea appeared in a Romania national team that played against Kuwait in 2002, but never appeared for the senior Romania national team.

References

External links
 
 Profile at TFF.org

1973 births
Living people
People from Beiuș
Romanian footballers
Association football defenders
Liga I players
Liga II players
FC Bihor Oradea players
FC Brașov (1936) players
FC Dinamo București players
Süper Lig players
Sakaryaspor footballers
Alki Larnaca FC players
Romanian expatriate footballers
Expatriate footballers in Turkey
Romanian expatriate sportspeople in Turkey
Expatriate footballers in Cyprus
Romanian expatriate sportspeople in Cyprus
Romanian football managers
ASA 2013 Târgu Mureș managers
FC Brașov (1936) managers
FC Olimpia Satu Mare managers